Djibouti–Ambouli International Airport  is a joint civilian/military-use airport situated in the town of Ambouli, Djibouti. It serves the national capital, Djibouti. The airport is located approximately 6 kilometres (4 miles) from the city centre. It occupies an area of 10 square kilometers.

History 

The airport was opened in 1948. Originally modest-sized, the facility grew in the post-independence period after a series of renovation projects.

In the mid-1970s, the airport was enlarged to accommodate more international carriers, with the state-owned Air Djibouti providing regular trips to its various destinations.

Civilian use 
Djibouti–Ambouli International Airport has a single terminal building, with one departure gate and one baggage carousel.

As the airport is located south of Djibouti City and its runways run east–west, an airliner's landing approach is usually directly over the conurbation of the capital, when the wind is from the west.

In 2010, the airport served 176,861 passengers.

Military use 
In addition to its use as a civilian airport, the airport hosts a military presence from a number of countries. Military traffic makes up approximately 75% of the airport's total traffic volume.

 Military of France
French Army 5th Overseas Interarms Regiment
French Army Light Aviation, 2 Puma and 1 Gazelle helicopter
French Air and Space Force (BA 188)
 Escadron de Chasse 3/11 Corse with the Dassault Mirage 2000-5
 Escadron de Transport 88 Larzac with the Aérospatiale SA 330 Puma and CASA/IPTN CN-235
 United States Armed Forces (Combined Joint Task Force-Horn of Africa)
Camp Lemonnier – formerly a base of the French Foreign Legion, the camp is located on the southern side of the airfield
 Djibouti Air Force – located on the southwest side of the airfield.
 Japan Self-Defense Forces
 Japan Self-Defense Force Base Djibouti was established in 2009 on a 12 ha site adjacent to the airport; two P-3C aircraft and 180 personnel are stationed here. This is the only JSDF base located outside Japan, and is intended to protect Japanese nationals and ships in the region from terrorism and piracy.
 Italian Air Force
 Supporting the European Union Naval Force – operating the General Atomics MQ-1 Predator.

Air-traffic controllers controversy 

According to military officials, US military flights comprised over 50 percent of the 30,000 departures and arrivals in 2014. Civilian air-traffic controllers hired by the Djiboutian government monitor the airspace over Camp Lemonnier's runways, unlike other major US military bases. US consultants stationed at the base reported that over a three-month period, the controllers made an average of 2,378 errors per 100,000 aircraft operations, an error rate reportedly 1,700 times greater than the US standard. US federal aviation experts suggested that an unprofessional attitude on the part of the controllers potentially imperiled American military and civilian flights to and from the airport. FAA officials asserted that the controllers' lax attitude, which allegedly included barring drones from taking off or landing, stemmed from a belief on their part that the US drones were unreliable aircraft and dangerous weapons aimed at killing Muslims.

The Djibouti government dismissed the air controller safety allegations as exaggerations or fabrications. US Ambassador to Djibouti Tom Kelly likewise indicated that, after asking for further improvements in aviation, progress was being registered at the airport. U.S. Navy Captain Kevin Bertelsen, the commanding officer at Camp Lemonnier, described work at the air base as challenging, but similarly indicated that conditions there had been ameliorated. In 2014, the US government also signed a new twenty-year lease with the Djibouti authorities to maintain its military base at the airport.

Airlines and destinations

Passenger

Cargo

Statistics

References

External links 
 
 
 
 

Airports in Djibouti
French Air and Space Force bases
Buildings and structures in Djibouti (city)
Military installations of France in other countries
Airports established in 1948
1948 establishments in Africa